Edwinstowe is a large village and civil parish in the Newark and Sherwood district of Nottinghamshire, England, on the edge of Sherwood Forest. It is associated with the legends of Robin Hood and Maid Marian and known for the proximity of the former Thoresby Colliery. The civil parish population at the 2011 census was 5,188. A 2019 estimate put it at 5,261.

Heritage
The etymology of the village name, "Edwin's resting place", recalls that the body of Edwin of Northumbria, King and Saint, was hidden in the church after he was killed in the Battle of Hatfield Chase, near Doncaster, probably in AD 633. The battle against King Penda of Mercia occurred near the present-day hamlet of Cuckney, some five miles north-west of modern Edwinstowe.

Edwinstowe is referred to twice in the Domesday Book as having five households, in addition to a priest and his four bordars, living in the hamlet in 1086.

Legend has it that Robin Hood married Maid Marian in St Mary's Church. Edwinstowe is known for the presence near the village of the Major Oak, a feature in the folk tales of Robin Hood, and Robin Hood's Larder.

Edwinstowe by the turn of the 20th century consisted of a cluster of houses along Town Street, East Lane, Church Street and High Street. A hamlet called Hazel Grove was bordered by Mill Lane and the railway line, while a cluster of houses at the top of Rufford Road was another hamlet called Lidgett. Lidgett was the site of a fireworks factory owned by F. Tudsbury and Co. before George Pinder, a local wine, spirit and porter merchant who resided at Lidgett House, took over ownership by 1886. These settlements eventually merged due to infills from World War I, much of it housing for colliers and named after the largest area.

Economy
Thoresby Colliery served as Edwinstowe's main source of employment until July 2015, when the mine was permanently closed. The loss of one of the last remaining deep coal mines in the country has left tourism as the main factor in the local economy.

Nottinghamshire County Council's nearby Sherwood Forest Visitors' Centre is scheduled for redevelopment and improvement. A contract awarded to RSPB intended for completion by late 2017 had a projected cost of £5.3 million.

Centre Parcs' Sherwood Forest holiday village is a local employer established in 1987, close to the edge of the village.

There was a post windmill south of the Mansfield Road with a small box-style roundhouse. It was driven by two common and two double-patent windmill sails.

Amenities

The two schools in the village are St Mary's Primary School and King Edwin Primary School. The former Rufford School on the north side of the village closed in 2003 and has become residential housing by Barratt Developments, known as Friars Park. A skate park on the development proved controversial with concerns over noise and anti-social behaviour.

The village has a business services provider, a St John's Ambulance amenity, an antiques centre, workshops, a fun park, a youth hostel, two arts and crafts centres, a village hall, and a community pest-control centre. Leisure facilities include Thoresby Colliery Band and Youth Band, a high-wire forest adventure course, a mountain biking, cyclo cross and forest walks centre, a forest fun park, and an outdoor adventure park. It still has five pubs: the Black Swan, the Dukeries Lodge, Forest Lodge, Hammer and Wedge,  and the Royal Oak. Other caterers include Smoke & Ice, Bistro Balsamico, The Cottage Tea Rooms, Fables Coffee House, The Honey Pot Cafe and Launay's Restaurant.

Environmental concerns are addressed under the Maun Valley Project Conservation Area.

Transport
Edwinstowe railway station functioned between 1897 and 1955. A goods line remains.

The village is served by half-hourly daytime Monday–Saturday bus services to Mansfield and Ollerton, six buses a day Monday–Saturday to Worksop, and one bus a day Monday–Friday to Nottingham. Services run twice a week to Newark and once a week to Lincoln.

Notable people
In order of birth: 
King Edwin of Northumbria c. 586–632/633) gave his name to the village.
The legendary Robin Hood is said to have married Maid Marian here.
John Holles, 1st Duke of Newcastle (1662–1711), politician and landowner, was born here.
E. Cobham Brewer (1810–1897), lexicographer, died at the vicarage, where his son-in-law was the vicar.
Henry Morley (1852–1924), first-class cricketer, was born and died here.
Fanny Jean Turing (1864–1934), politician and activist, was probably born in the village, where her father was vicar.
Fred Kitchen (1890–1969), countryside writer and autobiographer, was born here.
Francis Woodhead (1912–1991), first-class cricketer, was born here.
Philip Brett (1937–2002), musicologist and conductor, was born here.
Brendan Clarke-Smith (born 1980), Member of Parliament for Bassetlaw, was living in the village in December 2019.

References

External links

Edwinstowe Parish Council, residents' and visitors' site
Edwinstowe Historical Society
GeoHack Edwinstowe 

 
Villages in Nottinghamshire
Civil parishes in Nottinghamshire
Newark and Sherwood
Robin Hood